Cambodian Television Network (CTN) was launched in March 2003 as a joint venture between local conglomerate The Royal Group and Stockholm-based Modern Times Group, this free-to-air terrestrial television channel Cambodian Television Network (CTN) is now part of Mobitel. CTN provides viewers with a variety of entertainment and educational programmes, which includes home-grown documentaries, computer learning programmes and sitcoms. The channel has also bought rights to Sunday English Premier League football matches, European comedies and Asian drama series and South American telenovelas. International news is transmitted to CTN's broadcast facility at Srok Takhmao via satellite from London, enabling the channel to offer international and Asian news. CTN is available through the website and mobile applications.

References

External links
Culture Profiles
CTN Official Website

Television stations in Cambodia
Television channels and stations established in 2003
Mass media in Phnom Penh
2003 establishments in Cambodia